Hoplisoides is a genus of sand wasps in the family Crabronidae. There are at least 70 described species in Hoplisoides.

Species

References

Further reading

 
 
 

Crabronidae
Apoidea genera